Geteuma quadridentata is a species of beetle in the family Cerambycidae. It was described by Charles Coquerel in 1851. It is known from Madagascar.

References

Crossotini
Beetles described in 1851
Taxa named by Charles Coquerel